Kakori railway station is a small railway station in Lucknow district, Uttar Pradesh. Its code is KKJ. It serves Kakori village.

History 
On 9 August 1925, the station came into light of the world history when Indian revolutionary Ram Prasad Bismil, Ashfaqulla Khan, Rajendra Lahiri, Chandrashekhar Azad, Sachindra Bakshi, Keshab Chakravarty, Manmathnath Gupta, Murari Lal Gupta (fake name of Murari Lal Khanna), Mukundi Lal (Mukundi Lal Gupta) and Banwari Lal snatched the government's treasury from a train. The incident is called as Kakori train robbery or the Kakori conspiracy case of British period.

References

External links

Railway stations in Lucknow district
Moradabad railway division